Dagistheus ( 479) was an Ostrogothic chieftain. The name is Germanic. Theodoric the Great (r. 474–526) sent Dagistheus and Soas as hostages to Adamantius in Epirus in 479. He was presumably a leading Ostrogothic chieftain under Theodoric. The Roman baths in Constantinople were possibly named after him. He may have been an ancestor of the later Byzantine general Dagisthaeus.

References

Sources

5th-century Ostrogothic people
5th-century Byzantine people